David Hickey may refer to:

 David Hickey (Gaelic footballer), Gaelic footballer and doctor
 David Hickey (rugby union) (born 1991), Australian rugby union player
 David Francis Hickey (1882–1973), American-born bishop of the Catholic Church
 Dave Hickey (1938–2021), American writer